Gąsienica is a Polish-language surname common among the Goral population of Zakopane region literally meaning "caterpillar".

The commonality of this surname is reflected in the following question-answer joke: "Why does cabbage not grow in Zakopane?  – Because there are too many Caterpillars!" For the same reason Gorals use double-barrelled names, for better identification.

People
 Agnieszka Gąsienica-Daniel (born 1987), Polish alpine skier
 Andrzej Gąsienica-Makowski (born 1952), Polish politician
 Andrzej Gąsienica Roj (1930–1989), Polish alpine skier
 Franciszek Gąsienica Groń (1931–2014), Polish Nordic-combined skier
 Helena Gąsienica Daniel (1934–2013), Polish cross-country skier
 Jan Gąsienica (Sabała) (1809–1894), Polish poet
 Jan Gąsienica Ciaptak (1922–2009), Polish alpine skier
 Józef Gąsienica (1941–2005), Polish Nordic-combined skier
 Józef Gąsienica Sobczak (born 1934), Polish cross-country skier
 Maria Gąsienica Bukowa-Kowalska (born 1936), Polish cross-country skier
 Maria Gąsienica Daniel-Szatkowska (1936–2016), Polish alpine skier
 Maryna Gąsienica-Daniel (born 1994), Polish alpine skier
 Stanisław Gąsienica Daniel (born 1951), Polish ski jumper

References

See also
 

Polish-language surnames
Polish humour